The canton of Lavit was one of the 12 cantons of the arrondissement of Castelsarrasin, in the Tarn-et-Garonne department, in southern France. It had 3,056 inhabitants (2012). It was disbanded following the French canton reorganisation which came into effect in March 2015. It consisted of 14 communes, which joined the canton of Garonne-Lomagne-Brulhois in 2015.

The canton comprised the following communes:

 Asques
 Balignac
 Castéra-Bouzet
 Gensac
 Gramont
 Lachapelle
 Lavit
 Mansonville
 Marsac
 Maumusson
 Montgaillard
 Poupas
 Puygaillard-de-Lomagne
 Saint-Jean-du-Bouzet

References

Lavit
2015 disestablishments in France
States and territories disestablished in 2015